Amor Ilusivo is a compilation album by several artists from the label Coco Records. It was released in 1979 and is available as a digital download at iTunes and Amazon.

Track listing

Credits and personnel
Vocals: Danny Rivera, Wilkins, Yolandita Monge, Lissette, Alberto Carrión, Lucecita Benítez
Producer: Harvey Averne
Compilation: Harvey Averne
Photography, Artwork & Design: José Rosario / Rose River Designs

Notes
Track listing and credits from album cover.
Re-released digitally by Musical Productions.

References

Yolandita Monge albums
1979 albums